Quasielastic neutron scattering (QENS) designates a limiting case of inelastic neutron scattering, characterized by energy transfers being small compared to the incident energy of the scattered particles. In a more strict meaning, it denotes scattering processes where dynamics in the sample (such as diffusive dynamics) lead to a broadening of the incident neutron spectrum, in contrast to, e.g., the scattering from a diffusionless crystal, where the scattered neutron energy spectrum consists of an elastic line (corresponding to no energy transfer with the sample) and a number of well-separated inelastic lines due to the creation or annihilation of phonons with specific energies.

The term quasielastic scattering was originally coined in nuclear physics. It was applied to thermal neutron scattering since the early 1960s, notably in an article by Leon van Hove and in a highly cited one by Pierre Gilles de Gennes.

QENS is typically investigated on high-resolution spectrometers (neutron backscattering, neutron time-of-flight scattering, neutron spin echo).

It is used to investigate topics like
 solid-state diffusion (e.g. hydrogen in metals)
 slow modes in crystals (e.g. methyl group rotation)
 relaxation of viscous liquids

Conference Series 

Starting in 1992, there is a conference series entitled QENS. Since 2012, it is being held together with the Workshop on Inelastic Neutron Spectrometry (WINS).

Textbooks 

 M. Beé, Quasielastic Neutron Scattering, Adam Hilger: Bristol (1988).
 R. Hempelmann, Quasielastic Neutron Scattering and Solid State Diffusion, Clarendon Press: Oxford (2000).

References

Neutron scattering